HD 8673 is a binary star in the northern constellation of Andromeda. It has an apparent magnitude and absolute magnitude of 6.34 and 3.56 respectively. The system is moving further from the Earth with a heliocentric radial velocity of +19 km/s. A sub-stellar companion was detected in 2005; it could either be an exoplanet or a brown dwarf.

The primary component is an F-type main-sequence star with a stellar classification of F7 V. It has 1.36 times the mass of the Sun and 1.52 times the Sun's radius. The star is around 1.5 billion years old and is spinning with a projected rotational velocity of 26.9 km/s. It is radiating 3.4 times the Sun's luminosity from its photosphere at an effective temperature of 6,340 K.

Speckle interferometry measurements of this star between 2001 and 2008 showed a candidate stellar companion to this star, announced in 2011. It was unclear whether the pair formed a visual double or a binary system. Subsequent observations using adaptive options did not spot this companion and it was concluded this was a false detection. However, a low mass stellar companion was detected in a wide orbit.

Planetary system
An orbiting sub-stellar companion with a minimum mass 14 times that of Jupiter in a high-eccentricity orbit was discovered in 2005 and confirmed in 2010. This object orbits at 3 AU away from the primary star with a period of 1,634 days and an eccentricity of 0.7. In 2022, the inclination and true mass of HD 8673 Ab were measured via astrometry.

References

External links
 
 

F-type main-sequence stars
Andromeda (constellation)
Durchmusterung objects
008673
006702
0410
J01260875+3434471
Binary stars